Siamak Rahimpour  is an Iranian football defender who played for Iran in the 1988 Asian Cup.

Honours

AFC Asian Cup (third place): 1988

References

Teammelli.com Profile

1963 births
Living people
Iranian footballers
Esteghlal F.C. players
1988 AFC Asian Cup players
Footballers at the 1986 Asian Games
Association football defenders
Asian Games competitors for Iran
Iran international footballers